Paradise Isle is a 1937 American film directed by Arthur Greville Collins with sequences shot in American Samoa. The film was produced by Dorothy Davenport under the name "Dorothy Reid" and was released by Monogram Pictures. The film stars Mexican actress Movita Castaneda continuing her persona of a South Seas Island girl that began with Mutiny on the Bounty (1935).

Plot summary 
Kennedy is a shipwrecked blind artist who is washed ashore on an island en route to meeting an eminent eye surgeon in Suva who is the only chance to restore his sight.  He is nursed back to health by Ida, an island girl.  When Kennedy is distraught that he cannot pay for the operation due to his money being lost when his ship went down, Ida obtains a valuable black pearl that sets scheming in motion on the island paradise.

Cast 
Movita Castaneda as Ida
Warren Hull as Kennedy
William B. Davidson as Hoener
John St. Polis as Coxon
George Piltz as Tono (as George Pilita)
Pierre Watkin as Steinmeyer
Kenneth Harlan as Johnson
Russell Simpson as Baxter

Crew
Dorothy Davenport (Associate Producer)
Sam Koki (Original Music)
Gilbert Warrenton (Cinematographer)
Russell F. Schoengarth (Film Editor)
Scott R. Dunlap (Production Manager)
Harry Knight (Assistant Director)
William A. Wilmarth (Sound Recordist)
Fred Jackman (Special Effects)
E.R. Hickson (Technical Director)

Soundtrack 
 Warren Hull - "Paradise Isle" (written by Lani McIntyre and Napo Tuiteleleapaga)
"Hawaiian Chant" (written by Lani McIntyre and Napo Tuiteleleapaga)

External links 

Southseascinema.com

1937 films
1937 adventure films
American black-and-white films
1937 romantic drama films
Monogram Pictures films
American romantic drama films
Films set in Oceania
Films based on short fiction
Films shot in American Samoa
Films directed by Arthur Greville Collins
1930s English-language films
1930s American films